This article lists events that occurred during 1924 in Estonia.

Incumbents

Events
 Tallinn Jewish School was established.
 1 December – Estonian coup d'état attempt.

Births
17 October – Ülo Sooster, Estonian painter

Deaths

References

 
1920s in Estonia
Estonia
Estonia
Years of the 20th century in Estonia